Murujuga, formerly known as Dampier Island and today usually known as the Burrup Peninsula, is in the Dampier Archipelago, in the Pilbara region of Western Australia, containing the town of Dampier. The Dampier Rock Art Precinct, which covers the entire archipelago, is the subject of ongoing political debate due to historical and proposed industrial development. The Murujuga National Park lies within Burrup, and contains within it the world's largest collection of ancient rock art.

The region is sometimes confused with the Dampier Peninsula,  to the north-east.

History
The traditional owners, the Indigenous people of the Burrup Peninsula, are an Aboriginal nation known as the Yaburara (Jaburara) people. In Ngayarda languages, including that of the Aboriginal people of the peninsula, the Jaburara (or Yaburara) people, murujuga meant "hip bone sticking out". Between February and May 1869 a great number of Yaburara people were killed in an incident known as the Flying Foam Massacre.

The five clans who took over the care of the land as traditional custodians following the massacre include Yaburara, Ngarluma, Mardudhunera, Yindjibarndi and Wong-Goo-Tt-Oo peoples.

In 1963 the island became an artificial peninsula when it was connected to the mainland by a causeway for a road and railway. In 1979 Dampier Peninsula was renamed Burrup Peninsula after Mt Burrup, the highest peak on the island, which had been named after Henry Burrup, a Union Bank clerk murdered in 1885 at Roebourne.

Development vs heritage protection 

The peninsula is a unique ecological and archaeological area since it contains the Murujuga cultural landscape, the world's largest and most important collection of petroglyphs. Some of the Aboriginal rock carvings have been dated to more than 45,000 years old. The collection of standing stones here is the largest in Australia with rock art petroglyphs numbering over one million, many depicting images of the now extinct thylacine (Tasmanian tiger). Dampier Rock Art Precinct covers the entire archipelago, while the Murujuga National Park lies within Burrup.
Concern around the ecological, historical, cultural and archaeological significance of the area has led to a campaign for its protection, causing conflict with industrial development on the site. The preservation of the Murujuga monument has been called for since 1969, and in 2002 the International Federation of Rock Art Organizations (IFRAO) commenced a campaign to preserve the remaining monument. Murujuga has been listed in the National Trust of Australia Endangered Places Register and in the 2004, 2006, and 2008 World Monuments Watch by the World Monuments Fund.

Claims were made that 24.4 percent of the rock art on Murujuga had been destroyed to make way for industrial development between 1963 and 2006. However, the Western Australian government, responding to a question in parliament, argued for a much lower figure, suggesting that approximately 4 percent of sites, representing approximately 7.2 percent of petroglyphs, had been destroyed since 1972. However, as the Western Australian government has noted, there was no complete inventory of rock art in the region, making assessments of current and future impacts on the site a challenging task.

In 1996, a Burrup Peninsula Land Use Plan and Management Strategy, prepared by the Burrup Peninsula Management Advisory Board, presented an approach to multiple land use on the Burrup Peninsula. The primary purpose of the plan was to allocate land for industry, conservation, heritage and recreation, following on from an earlier multiple land-use plans for the Burrup Peninsula The Pilbara 21, Final Strategy Report (1992). The 1996 plan attempted to balance competing land uses through the division of the Burrup Peninsula into two broad land use areas: (a) Conservation, Heritage and Recreation Area; and (b) an Industrial Area. While the comment was provided in the plan on "the value of the Northern Burrup for the preservation of its renowned Aboriginal heritage and environmental values", no comment was made on the amount of rock art affected by development and recreational activities.

In 1998, the Ngarluma and Yindjibarndi people had a joint native title claim which included the Murujuga cultural landscape. The North West Shelf Joint Venture, which includes the Karratha Gas Plant, subsequently entered into a land access agreement with the Ngarluma and Yindjibarndi people. The Ngarluma and Yindjibarndi people established the Ngarluma and Yindjibarndi Foundation Limited (NYFL). Since 2000, NYFL has been the traditional owner representative organisation for the North West Shelf area. The 1998 agreement with the Ngarluma and Yindjibarndi people is largely considered to be outdated and fails to meet accepted standards for industry agreements with traditional owners. 

Work commissioned by the National Trust of Western Australia led it to nominate the site for the National Trust Endangered Places list in 2002. In 2004, funding was provided by American Express through the World Monuments Fund for further research and advocacy to be undertaken, with the goal of achieving national heritage status for the site. In 2006 the Australian Heritage Council advised the federal Environment and Heritage Minister that the site was suitable for listing on the National Heritage List.

The Western Australian state government continued to support development at the site, arguing a lack of cost-effective alternative sites and that geographical expansion of facility areas will be extremely limited. The campaign against development has blurred some traditional political boundaries, with former conservative party Resources Development Minister Colin Barnett supporting campaigns to save rock art in this area.

The debate placed the federal government in a difficult situation. On the one hand, national heritage bodies have supported protection for the area, and the governments at national and state level have been of opposing political parties, giving the federal government reason to support site protection. On the other hand, the Western Australian economy has been crucial to Australia's economic wealth generally, and its export earnings in particular, and the national government is reluctant to appear to interfere with that economic prosperity.

The protest campaign against development garnered popular support: 

The debate continued, with the Australian Government still to determine what, if any, intervention it might make in the case under federal heritage protection or other laws, by June 2007. The federal minister indicated support for National Heritage listing, however the question of site boundaries and management strategies was still under negotiation. The site was heritage-listed in 2007.

On 7 July 2008, the Australian Government placed 90% of the remaining rock art areas of the Dampier Archipelago on the National Heritage List. Campaigners continued to demand that the Australian Government include all of the undisturbed areas of the Dampier Archipelago on the World Heritage List. According to the Philip Adams radio show on Radio National, one worker on the site, an electrician for Woodside claimed the company had crushed 10,000 petroglyphs for road fill, at a time of international outrage over the Taliban destruction of the Bamiyan buddhas. The oldest representation of a human face was also destroyed. The rock pools are filled with green scum, the eucalypts of the area dying, the fluming of escaping natural gas, from faulty piping, rises as high as a six-storey building and burns the equivalent of the entire annual emissions in New Zealand, every day.

In February 2009, the state government released a report finding that industry emissions did not damage the rock art.  WA Greens Senator Rachel Siewart criticised Premier Colin Barnett, who had previously supported environmental protection for the rock art.

As of 2011, the area remained on the World Monument Fund's list of 100 Most Endangered Places in the World - the only such site in Australia - because of continued mismanagement of the heritage and conservation values of the Burrup.

In January 2020, the Australian Government lodged a submission for the Murujuga cultural landscape to be included as an Australian entry to the World Heritage Tentative List.

The project includes a floating production unit, the drilling of 13 wells, and a  pipeline to transport the gas to the onshore Pluto LNG processing facility near Karratha, which will be expanded. Production is expected to begin in 2026. The project has received environmental approval. The Murujuga Aboriginal Corporation has no role in approving such industrial projects, but there is research being undertaken as to whether increased emissions would affect the rock art.

The relationship between traditional owners and Woodside has been complex. In July 2022, Raelene Cooper presented the concerns of some of the traditional owners to the UN in Geneva, which stated "The rock art archives our lore. It is written not on a tablet of stone, but carved into the ngurra, which holds our Dreaming stories and Songlines.". She also wrote to government ministers Linda Burney and Tanya Plibersek.

Undersea archaeological site
On 1 July 2020, scientists published a study reporting on the finding of Australia's first ever ancient Aboriginal underwater archaeological sites at two sites off the Burrup Peninsula. The 269 artefacts found at Cape Bruguieres, as well as an 8,500-year-old underwater freshwater spring at Flying Foam Passage off Dampier are described in the study. Estimated to be thousands of years old, the artefacts include hundreds of stone tools and grinding stones, evidence of life before sea levels rose between 7,000 and 18,000 years ago, after the last ice age. The Australian Archaeological Association described the research as "highly significant".

The report was the result of four years of work by a team of archaeologists, rock art specialists, geomorphologists, geologists, specialist pilots and scientific divers, funded by the Australian Research Council, in collaboration with the Murujuga Aboriginal Corporation, on a project known as the "Deep History of Sea Country" project. Teams from Flinders University, the University of Western Australia, James Cook University, Airborne Research Australia, and the University of York in England were involved.

The site was placed on the WA Aboriginal Heritage List (protected under the Aboriginal Heritage Act 1972), and the Federal Government said such underwater sites fall under the state jurisdiction. The federal Underwater Cultural Heritage Act 2018 was updated in 2019 to automatically include sunken aircraft and shipwrecks older than 75 years, but it does not automatically include Aboriginal sites.

Ngajarli Trail 
After the Murujuga National Park was closed for some months to allow for its construction, the Ngajarli Trail was completed in August 2020. Traditional owners working in collaboration with the government created a  universal boardwalk, along with interpretative signs. The Murujuga Aboriginal Corporation hopes to improve and enlarge facilities for visitors and to help them appreciate the cultural significance of the site.

See also
 Flying Foam massacre
 Visual arts of Australia

References

Further reading
 Burrup and Beyond: A short guide to the area's cultural heritage and history by Ken Mulvaney, 2013, sponsored by Rio Tinto, 49 pages.

Vinnicombe, P. (2002), Petroglyphs of the Dampier Archipelago: Background to Development and Descriptive Analysis, Rock Art Research, Volume 19, No 1, pp 3–27

External links

 
 Friends of Australian Rock Art Website of FARA
 Save Dampier Rock Art home-page
The World Monuments Fund's Watch Listing for the Dampier Rock Art

Australian Aboriginal cultural history
Rock art in Australia
Heritage places of Western Australia
Archaeological sites in Western Australia
Dampier Archipelago
Australian National Heritage List
North West Shelf